XL Brigade, Royal Field Artillery was a brigade of the Royal Field Artillery which served in the First World War.

It was originally formed with 6th, 23rd and 49th Batteries, and attached to 3rd Infantry Division. In August 1914, it mobilised and was sent to the Continent with the British Expeditionary Force, where it saw service with 3rd Division throughout the war. 130th (Howitzer) Battery joined the brigade in May 1916.

External links
Royal Field Artillery Brigades
3rd Division Order of Battle

Notes

References

Royal Field Artillery brigades
Artillery units and formations of World War I